Julio Alberto Rodas Hurtarte (born 9 December 1966) is a retired Guatemalan professional football striker.

Club career
At the club level, Rodas started his professional career playing for Municipal. He then had a one-season stint in El Salvador with C.D. FAS and later returned to Guatemala to play for Comunicaciones. During the latter part of his career, he played for Antigua GFC and Deportivo Jalapa.

International career
Rodas was also a member of the Guatemala national team, and was selected as part of the squad that participated at the 1988 Olympic tournament. With the senior national team, he played during the World Cup qualification processes for the 1990, 1994, and 1998 tournaments.

Julio is the elder brother of Jorge, who was his teammate in Municipal and Comunicaciones and was also a member of the national team.

References

External links
 FIFA – Record at FIFA tournaments

1966 births
Living people
People from Jalapa Department
Association football midfielders
Guatemalan footballers
Guatemalan expatriate footballers
Guatemala international footballers
Olympic footballers of Guatemala
Footballers at the 1988 Summer Olympics
1991 CONCACAF Gold Cup players
1996 CONCACAF Gold Cup players
2000 CONCACAF Gold Cup players
C.S.D. Municipal players
Comunicaciones F.C. players
Expatriate footballers in El Salvador
Guatemalan expatriate sportspeople in El Salvador
C.D. FAS footballers
Deportivo Jalapa players
Place of birth missing (living people)
Antigua GFC players